Draco quadrasi, Quadras's flying lizard, is a species of agamid lizard. It is found in the Philippines.

References

Draco (genus)
Reptiles of the Philippines
Reptiles described in 1893
Taxa named by Oskar Boettger